The South African Railways Class 14C 4-8-2 of 1919 was a steam locomotive.

In 1919, the South African Railways placed a second batch of twenty  steam locomotives with a 4-8-2 Mountain type wheel arrangement in service. In addition to the first two batches, two more batches were acquired between 1919 and 1922, each with a different maximum axle loading, to bring the total in the class to 73. Through reboilerings, rebalancings and cylinder bushings during its service life, this single class eventually ended up as six distinct locomotive classes with two boiler types and a multitude of axle load and boiler pressure configurations.

Manufacturer
In 1919, the second batch of twenty Class 14C locomotives was also ordered from the Montreal Locomotive Works (MLW) in Canada. It was delivered in that same year and numbered in the range from 1881 to 1900. Until 1922, two more batches of Class 14C locomotives would follow from the same manufacturer. All four batches differed in terms of maximum axle loading, adhesive weight and engine weight.

Characteristics
The locomotive design followed North American practice in many ways and their appearance was typically American, with high running boards and large cabs. They had bar frames, Walschaerts valve gear, Belpaire fireboxes and were superheated.

As built, the locomotives of the second batch were  lighter than those of the first batch.

Modifications and reclassifications
The Class 14C proved to be good locomotives, even though they initially suffered from some serious teething troubles. During 1920, it was found necessary to restay most of the fireboxes on the early orders of the Class 14C. Their reversing gear was of the single cylinder type and tended to creep. D.A. Hendrie, at the time the Chief Mechanical Engineer (CME) of the South African Railways (SAR), therefore fitted oil cylinders and installed his Hendrie reversing gear, which was manufactured in the Pretoria workshops during 1922. Modifications were also made to the finger bars and rocking grate cylinders of the firebox and to the sanding gear. Approximately  of lead were run into the smokebox saddle casting to provide additional weight on the leading bogie.

Watson Standard boilers
During the 1930s, many serving locomotives were reboilered with a standard boiler type designed by A.G. Watson, CME of the SAR at the time, as part of his standardisation policy. Such Watson Standard reboilered locomotives were reclassified by adding an "R" suffix to their classification.

Only slight alterations were necessary to the engine frames.

The reboilered engines were also equipped with Watson cabs with their distinctive slanted fronts, compared to the conventional vertical fronts of their original cabs. Early conversions were equipped with copper and later conversions with steel fireboxes. Two of them, numbers 1894 and 1898, would not undergo further modifications and would retain the Class 14CR designation until they were withdrawn from service.

The original Belpaire boiler was fitted with Ramsbottom safety valves, while the Watson Standard boiler was fitted with Pop safety valves.

Rebalancing
Around 1930, the question of maximum axle loads for locomotives was thoroughly investigated by the Mechanical and Civil Engineering Departments of the SAR. It was found that, along with some other locomotive classes, the Class 14C had a rather severe vertical hammer blow effect on the track when running at speed due to an undue proportion of the reciprocating parts being balanced. Modifications were accordingly made to the Class 14C to allow some of them to run on  track.

The locomotives had weights attached between the frames to increase adhesion. Over time, most of the Class 14C family of locomotives were "rebalanced" by having these weights increased or reduced to redistribute, increase or reduce the axle loading and adhesive weight by altering the loads on the individual coupled wheels, leading bogies and trailing pony trucks. Coupled wheel axle loading adjustment was achieved by attaching steel boxes filled with an appropriate amount of lead over each axle between the frames.

The lighter version of the rebalanced locomotives was reclassified to Class 14CB, with the "B" indicating branchline service. Those which were also reboilered with Watson Standard no. 2 boilers were reclassified to Class 14CRB. Reclassified Class 14C locomotives often did not receive new number plates. Instead, the previous Class number was milled out and a separate small plate, inscribed with the new Class number and "R" suffix, was attached to the number plate.

Cylinder bushing
Several of the locomotives had their cylinders bushed to reduce the bore from the as-built .

Service
The Class 14C was placed in service on the Cape Eastern system, working the Umtata branch into Transkei and on the mainline to Cookhouse. Some went to the Cape Western system where they banked up the Hex River Pass from De Doorns and later worked with Class 19C locomotives across Sir Lowry's Pass to Caledon and Bredasdorp in the Overberg. A few were also used on the Cape Midland system, in Natal and Eastern Transvaal.

In their later years, many of these locomotives remained on the Cape Western system, most being shedded at Paardeneiland in Cape Town and at Beaufort West, and one at De Aar, mostly being used as shunting engines and on short local pick-ups. A large number were also used on the Cape Eastern system, shedded at East London and used as shunting engines, on local pick-ups and also in suburban service. A few also served their last years in Eastern Transvaal, shedded at Pietersburg and Witbank.

Works numbers
The table lists their years built, manufacturer's works numbers, engine numbers and eventual classifications.

Illustration

References

1780
1780
4-8-2 locomotives
2D1 locomotives
MLW locomotives
Cape gauge railway locomotives
Railway locomotives introduced in 1919
1919 in South Africa